Linwood is an unincorporated community in Pocahontas County, West Virginia, United States.

The community most likely was named for linden trees near the original town site.

References

Unincorporated communities in Pocahontas County, West Virginia
Unincorporated communities in West Virginia